Tungsten Network is a global electronic invoicing firm that provides supply chain financing services from international offices in the United Kingdom, United States, Bulgaria, Germany, and Malaysia. As a small- to medium-sized IT company, they have an estimated revenue of £31.3 million (GBP) as of July 2017. Tungsten Corporation Plc (TUNG) is reported to trade regularly on the London Stock Exchange. Main competitors in this arena include Tradeshift, Ariba, Basware, Taulia and iPayables.

History
Tungsten Network "was founded [in 2013] by Edmund Truell and Danny Truell to identify and acquire a company, business or asset within the financial services sector which it can grow into a business with a significant market presence in a segment with potential for sustainable long-term cash generation, return on equity and growth." A major acquisition was OB10, a global electronic transaction service with headquarters in London, England. Founded in 2000 by Stefan Foryszewski, Chris Lowrie, Alain Falys and John Jermy, Tungsten Network underwent a series of corporate expansions and acquisitions. The company, led by its founder and CEO Edmund "Eddie" Truell, agreed to the 2013 buyout of Open Business Exchange for £99 million (GBP) in cash and shares. The purchase of DocuSphere in September 2014 significantly extended their e-invoice automation technology.

Founded from Open Business Exchange, or OB10, Tungsten Network's electronic invoicing and payment services are partnered with companies including Alliance Data, IBM, Kellogg's, General Motors, and the US Federal Government. Nearly 80% of the suppliers Tungsten serves are small to medium-sized global business.

OB10 collaboration and acquisition - 2000
When OB10 was founded, e-invoicing services were not permitted in a majority of the European Union. However, OB10's services were launched in late 2000, followed by the establishment of offices in New York. As e-invoicing services grew, OB10 established offices in San Francisco and Atlanta in the United States, as well as Sofia, Bulgaria and Kuala Lumpur, Malaysia. Tungsten officially purchased OB10 in October 2013.

Transition to Tungsten Network - 2013
Tungsten Corporation finalized the acquisition of OB10 in October 2013, rebranding the e-invoicing platform “Tungsten Network”. Tungsten purchased OB10 for £99 million, as well as having signed a five-year agreement to license @UK's Spend Analysis software. Tungsten Network provides a global cloud-based trading network built on OB10's e-invoicing platform. The service integrates client billing and accounting systems with their suppliers' invoicing and accounting systems.

Purchasing DocuSphere - 2014
In September 2014, Tungsten acquired DocuSphere – a US-based provider of invoice-automation services. The purchase was funded by a share placing, rather than an open offer.

Tungsten of today
In September 2019, Andrew Lemonofides took over as chief executive officer of Tungsten Corporation plc from Richard Hurwitz.

On July 9, 2021, Paul Cooper was appointed as the new CEO.

Products
Tungsten Network provides professional electronic services for accounts payable and accounts receivable to over 203,000 suppliers in 175 countries. The company was one of the first vendors to push an “open network” concept, along with Basware. Tungsten Network currently serves 72% of Fortune 500 companies and 70% of the Financial Times Stock Exchange 100 Index (FTSE). In the fall of 2017, Tungsten released its inaugural Friction Index report to showcase the amount of time that is being spent on inefficient practices.

Tungsten Network
Tungsten Network is Tungsten's core business, a worldwide buyer-supplier community that processed over £133 billion in transactions in fiscal year 2016. The network processes invoices and purchase order transactions through Tungsten Network's online portal, with the aim to reduce human touch points to deliver secure transactions.

Tungsten Network Workflow
Tungsten Network Workflow is a software suite that automates accounts payable processes and includes a document repository and reporting. The suite offers end-to-end visibility of invoices from initial receipt until payment by monitoring payment processing in an ERP system and pulling back the associated payment data.

Tungsten Network Analytics 
This product analyzes procurement spending based on invoice data. The software provides line-level product information, analyzes campaigns, and matches prices for competing products. Tungsten Network Analytics is fully compliant with US federal requirements as of April 2014.

References

Information technology companies of the United Kingdom
Software companies established in 2000
Computer companies established in 2000
Electronics companies of the United Kingdom
Technology companies based in London
2000 establishments in England
Companies listed on the London Stock Exchange